"Up, Up and Away" is a 1967 song written by Jimmy Webb and recorded (as "Up–Up and Away") by US soul-pop act the 5th Dimension, whose big hit version reached no. 7 on Billboard's Hot 100 in July 1967 and no. 9 on its Easy Listening chart. The single reached number one in both Canada and Australia. In 1999 Webb's song placed 43 on BMI's "Top 100 Songs of the Century".

A canonical example of sunshine pop, themed around images of hot air ballooning, it cleaned up at the 10th Annual Grammy Awards in 1968, winning for Record of the Year, Song of the Year, Best Pop Performance by a Duo or Group with Vocals, Best Performance by a Vocal Group, Best Performance by a Chorus and Best Contemporary Song. The instrumental backing was performed by members of the Wrecking Crew, including trumpeter Tony Terran and drummer Hal Blaine.

Personnel
According to the AFM contract sheet, the following musicians played on the track.

Hal Blaine
Bones Howe
Larry Knechtel
Gayle Levant
Joe Osborn
Johnny Rivers
Tommy Tedesco
Jimmy Webb

Chart history

Weekly charts

Year-end charts

Notable cover versions
In the United Kingdom the 5th Dimension single failed to chart. Released first, a version by US vocal act the Johnny Mann Singers reached no. 6 in August 1967, and in 1968 won a Grammy Award for Best Performance by a Chorus. A French-language recording achieved popularity in Quebec.
Frank Ifield released a cover version on EMI (UK) Columbia label as a 1967 A-side single (released on July 7, 1967).

Usage in media
 For a time, Dionne Warwick's song "I'll Never Love This Way Again" preceded reports about people with HIV/AIDS on Rush Limbaugh’s radio show. These later became "condom updates," preceded by “Up, Up and Away”.

References

External links
 Guitar Tabs & Lyrics 
 Images of 1967 Single

1967 songs
1967 singles
Songs written by Jimmy Webb
The 5th Dimension songs
Grammy Award for Record of the Year
Grammy Award for Song of the Year
Grammy Award for Best Performance by a Chorus
Ballooning
Songs used as jingles
Number-one singles in Australia
RPM Top Singles number-one singles